Star Standard (April 22, 1992 – December 9, 1997) was a millionaire American Thoroughbred racehorse. Bred in Kentucky by Highclere, Inc. & Louis Roussel III and raced under the William Condren banner as his owner. He was sired by top stallion Risen Star, who in turn was a son of Secretariat. His dam was Hoist Emy's Flag daughter of graded stakes winner Hoist The Flag. He finished racing with a record of 7-4-3 in 25 starts with career earnings of $1,121,512. Star Standard was best known for his win in the grade one Pimlico Special and his runner-up finish in the grade one Belmont Stakes.

Two-year-old season 

Star Standard got a late start to his racing career and only raced twice as a two-year-old and only won a maiden special weight race on his second attempt.

Three-year-old season 

As a three-year-old, Star Standard began improving in the spring of 1995. After a ninth-place finish to Thunder Gulch, Suave Prospect and Mecke in the Florida Derby he shipped to Kentucky. With only two weeks until the Kentucky Derby, Zito decided to pass the Derby and run in the second jewel of the Triple Crown, the Preakness Stakes.
 
In the $500,000 Preakness, Star Standard was bumped coming out of the gate. He was pushed back into the rear tier but jockey Chris McCarron charged him up to the leader Mystery Storm. At the 5/16th pole he put a head in front while splitting rivals. He held on well until the final sixteenth and weekend to finish fourth still earning a check. Nick Zito had a legitimate excuse in the Preakness and decided to send him on to the Belmont. In the Belmont Stakes, Star Standard ran the race of his life and finished second to Dual Classic winner Thunder Gulch.

In the late summer and early fall of the year, Zito decided to run Star Standard against the best older horses in training in two races. In the first of those races he finished a strong second in September to the incomparable Cigar in the grade one Woodward Stakes at Saratoga Race Course. In the second, Cigar again dominated the field in the grade one Jockey Club Gold Cup in October as Star Standard ran third to him and Unaccounted For.

Four-year-old season 

At the beginning of his four-year-old season in 1996, Star Standard ran a courageous race in the grade one Gulfstream Park Handicap leading almost the entire race. Near the wire the gray Wekiva Springs wore down Star Standard and beat him by a half length.

Later that year, Star Standard began to train like gangbusters and Zito needed to find a race to test his sharpened skills. He entered him in the $600,000 grade one Pimlico Special Handicap at "Old Hilltop" in Baltimore, Maryland. Star Standard broke from gate four and rushed straight to the lead under jockey Pat Day. He was the longest shot in the short field at Pimlico Race Course at 6-1 but he didn't act that way. Going into the far turn, Star Standard had led every step of the way in the first three quarters of a mile. At the top of the stretch, Key of Luck, Geri and Wekiva Springs all made a strong bid at the leader but failed to ever gain even terms. Star Standard won by an even length in front of Key of Luck. Geri finished almost seven lengths back in third and the 4-5 favorite Wekiva Springs could do no better than fourth, nine lengths back. Star Standard avenged his Gulfstream loss.

On October 22, 1997, Star Standard had to be pulled off of the race track during an allowance race at Keeneland. Injuries that had kept him out of racing for a year had taken a more life-threatening surge to a condition known as laminitis, which his grandfather Secretariat was euthanized for. Initially, treatments appeared to be healing; but by early December, he had stopped responding to treatments and could not stand. The decision was made to euthanize him on the morning on December 9, leaving him with the same fate as his grandfather, but at a much younger age.

References

1992 racehorse births
1997 racehorse deaths
Thoroughbred family A1
Racehorses bred in Kentucky
Racehorses trained in the United States